List of works by Arnold Wathen Robinson includes information about some of the works of British stained glass artist Arnold Wathen Robinson. His works were, with just a few exceptions, conducted for churches.

List of works

Gallery

Bristol Cathedral

All Saint's, Bristol

St. Michael the Archangel

St. Matthew's Church, Bristol

Tyndale Baptist Church

Notes

References

Bibliography
 Beaty, David. (1995). "Light Perpetual-Aviators’ Memorial Windows". Airlife. .
 Foyle, Andrew and Nikolaus Pevsner. (2011). "The Buildings of England. Somerset: North and Bristol." Yale University Press. .
 Whittingham, Sarah. (2003). "Wills Memorial Building". University of Bristol, Centre for Curriculum & Assessment Studies. Number 1. .

Robinson